The 2010 Tour de Romandie (64th Edition) cycling road race started on 27 April and finished on 2 May in Switzerland.  It was the 6th event in the 2010 UCI ProTour, and the 13th event in the World Calendar. The race winner had been declared as Alejandro Valverde, who won the final stage to take the race by 11 seconds. However, some four weeks after the end of the race the UCI placed Valverde under a two-year suspension for his involvement in the 2006 Operación Puerto doping case, which was backdated to, and involved removal of all his results since, 1 January 2010.  Simon Špilak was thus promoted to winner of the event.

Pre-Race Favourites 

Denis Menchov of Russia is also a favourite.

While not a favourite to win overall, local Alexandre Moos has a lot going for him as this will be his 12th and final Tour de Romandie.

Teams 
There are 20 teams for the 2010 Tour de Romandie. They are:

Stages

Prologue
27 April 2010 – Lausanne to Lausanne,  (ITT)

This short course took in the beautiful, historic village of Porrentruy. Classics fans were pleased to hear there is a 400 metres cobbled section.

Stage 1
28 April 2010 – Porrentruy to Fleurier, 

A hilly stage in the Jura mountains north of Lake Neuchatel. Two category 1 climbs and a category 2 – and a few other bumps along the way. Although the last 10 km are downhill, the course may be well suited to a break-away.

Peter Sagan – the up-and-coming young cyclist claimed the victory in the sprint. It was his third victory of the season. The win put him in first place overall as he was just 0.92 seconds behind the previous leader, Marco Pinotti. Sagan was pleased with the win, but pledged his loyalty to  team leader Roman Kreuziger. According to  Cycling News, Sagan said, 

Sprinter Mark Cavendish could not hang in the mountains and was dropped from the peloton with 45 km to go. Had he not, a victory would have helped teammate Marco Pinotti remain in the leaders jersey.

Stage 2
29 April 2010 – Fribourg to Fleurier, 

This stage looks to be for the sprinters. The course will pass through Fribourg twice before a flat finish. Although two category one climbs are listed they are tiny. The course will climb twice the locally famous and steep cobbled climb "Lorette."  Anyone hoping to foil the sprinters will need to attack here.

Stage 3
30 April 2010 – Moudon to Moudon, (ITT)

It's a short time trial but the first 7 kilometres are uphill at around 4%.

Stage 4
1 May 2010 – Vevey to Châtel-Saint-Denis, 

For the first time in more than 40 years, Romandie will have a stage finish in France.  Starting in Vevey (Switzerland), the route will pass UCI headquarters in Aigle before turning up into the French Alps climbing the Categorie 1 "Pas de Morgins."

The top of the climb is the Swiss / French border. The final climb – the Categorie 1 Col du Corbier – is 6 km at roughly 8% – not easy.  And while the summit is 20+ km from the finish, the last 17 kilometres are a gradual uphill.

Before this stage Mark Cavendish winner of stage 2, was withdrawn by his team for his two fingered celebration after victory.

Stage 5
2 May 2010 – Sion to Sion, 

The "Queen" stage.  It's very short, but has three very difficult climbs.

Final standings

General classification

Sprints classification

Mountain classification

Youth classification

Jersey progress

References

External links
 

2010 UCI ProTour
2010
2010 in Swiss sport
Tour de Romandie